The  is a river located in Gunma Prefecture, Japan. It is a branch of the Tone River and the government of Japan classifies it as a Class 1 river. It generally flows in a south-easterly direction.

Karasu means "black water" in many Turkic languages.

River communities 
The river passes through or forms the boundary of the following communities:

Gunma Prefecture
Takasaki, Fujioka, Tamamura
Nagano Prefecture
Saku
Saitama Prefecture
Kamisato, Honjō

Scenic areas 
The river runs through the Karasugawa Ravine in Takasaki, which has hiking trails for visitors to access the river.

References 

Rivers of Gunma Prefecture
Rivers of Nagano Prefecture
Rivers of Saitama Prefecture
Rivers of Japan